Wendell G. Gilliard (born August 1, 1954) is an American politician, steelworker, and union official. A Democrat, Gilliard serves as a member of the South Carolina House of Representatives, representing the 111th district.

Early life
Gilliard was born in Charleston, South Carolina. His father came from Marion, South Carolina, and worked at the Charleston Air Force Base. He has five siblings. Gilliard's mother died of an aneurysm when he was five years old.

Gilliard grew up on the East Side of Charleston before moving to West Ashley at the age of seven. He attended Burke High School and Rivers High School, graduating from Rivers in 1973. He then attended Bell and Howell School of Technology (now known as DeVry University). He also attended the United Steelworkers of America program which was held on the campus of Tennessee State University.

Career
Gilliard left Bell and Howell after three years to work in a retail store owned by his brother. The store closed due to declining sales, and in 1981, Gilliard began to work as a plant operator for Mobil Chemical. He later worked for Rhodia. In 1982, Gilliard was elected vice president of Local 863 of the United Steelworkers. He later became its president.

Gillard was elected a Charleston City Councilman in 1998. In 1999, he sponsored non-binding legislation that labeled the Ku Klux Klan as a terrorist organization. He was unopposed in his bid for a second term in 2002. In 2003, Gilliard walked out of a city council meeting after Herb Silverman, an atheist, gave an invocation. While serving as a city councilman, Gilliard levied a charge of unsafe working conditions against Rhodia, and was fired. He also rallied against a porn shop and for modesty laws in Marion Square.

In 2008, he ran for the South Carolina House of Representatives in the 111th district. Gilliard contemplated running in the special election for South Carolina's 1st congressional district.

On March 13, 2023 Gilliard announced his intention to run for the South Carolina Senate District 42 seat, to be vacated by Marlon Kimpson after his appointment to a role in the Biden Administration. The seat will be decided in a special election in 2023.

Personal life
Gilliard has four children, three sons and one daughter. He is divorced.

References

1954 births
Living people
Politicians from Charleston, South Carolina
South Carolina city council members
Democratic Party members of the South Carolina House of Representatives
United Steelworkers people
African-American state legislators in South Carolina
21st-century American politicians
21st-century African-American politicians
20th-century African-American people